Frederick Platt-Higgins (1840 – 6 November 1910) was a British businessman and Conservative MP for Salford North.

Early life 
Born as Frederick Higgins, he was the son of James Higgins of Salford, Lancashire and Elizabeth Meban of Dumfries. He went into business as a cotton spinner and married Mary Emily Mottram of Manchester in 1864. In 1888 his aunt, Margaret Platt of Stalybridge, widow of Robert Platt of Dunham Hall, died. As part of the conditions of her will she required that her nephews adopt the surname Platt-Higgins and quarter the Platt and Higgins coats of arms. This was carried into effect by a royal licence in the following year.

Career 
At the 1895 general election Platt-Higgins was elected as Conservative Member of Parliament for Salford North. He retained the seat for eleven years, being unseated at the Liberal landslide at the 1906 general election.

Personal life 
Platt-Higgins made his home at "Homeleigh", Bowdon, Cheshire, later retiring to "Woodham Place", Horsell, near Woking, Surrey. He died at Horsell in 1910 of pneumonia.

His daughter Brenda married Major Edward Vincent Osborne Hewett son of the late Leiut. General E O Hewett R.E. C.M.G. in 1904.

References
Source

Citations

External links 
 

1840 births
1910 deaths
Conservative Party (UK) MPs for English constituencies
UK MPs 1895–1900
UK MPs 1900–1906
Members of the Parliament of the United Kingdom for Salford North